Hants West is a provincial electoral district in Nova Scotia, Canada, that elects one member of the Nova Scotia House of Assembly.

The district has existed since 1949. Prior to that it, along with Hants East, were a part of the district of Hants County.

Geography
Hants West has  of landmass.

Members of the Legislative Assembly
This riding has elected the following Members of the Legislative Assembly:

Election results

1949 general election

1953 general election

1956 general election

1960 general election

1963 general election

1967 general election

1970 general election

1974 general election

1978 general election

1981 general election

1984 general election

1988 general election

1993 general election

1998 general election

1999 general election

2003 general election

2006 general election

2009 general election

2013 general election 

|-
 
|Progressive Conservative
|Chuck Porter
|align="right"|4,468 
|align="right"|50.75
|align="right"|
|-
 
|Liberal
|Claude Sherman O'Hara
|align="right"|3,279 
|align="right"|37.24 
|align="right"|
|-
 
|New Democratic Party
| Brian Stephens
|align="right"|888 
|align="right"|10.28
|align="right"|
|}

2017 general election

2021 general election

References

External links
riding profile
1999 Poll by Poll Results
1998 Poll by Poll Results

Nova Scotia provincial electoral districts